The Anselmianum, also known as the Pontifical Athenaeum of Saint Anselm is a pontifical university in Rome associated with the Benedictines. It offers courses in philosophy, theology, liturgy, monastic studies, languages, sacramental theology, and the history of theology.

History
The university was founded in its present form by Pope Leo XIII in 1887, created in honor of St. Anselm of Canterbury. An additional Pontifical Institute of Sacred Liturgy was canonically established by the Holy See as a faculty of Sacred Liturgy in order to promote liturgical science through research and teaching. As such it is empowered to grant, in the name of the Pope, the unique academic degrees of License (SL.L.) and Doctorate (SL.D.) in Sacred Liturgy.

Leadership
The chancellor (gran cancelliere) of the Anselmianum is Gregory Polan, OSB, the Abbot Primate of the Benedictine Confederation.

Since 5 December 2019, the rector (rettore magnifico) of the Anselmianum is Bernhard A. Eckerstorfer, OSB, a Benedictine monk of Kremsmünster Abbey in Austria.

Since 4 February 2021, the vice rector is Fernando Rivas, OSB, a Benedictine monk of the Abadía de San Benito in Argentina. Rivas also serves as the Dean of the Faculty of Theology.

The president of the Pontifical Institute of Sacred Liturgy (Preside del Pontificio Istituto Liturgico) is Jordi-Agustí Piqué i Collado, OSB, a Benedictine monk of Santa Maria de Montserrat Abbey.

Activities
The University's library was established with gifts from various Benedictine congregations and the personal collections of Cardinal Dusmet Gaetano Bernardino, and has since grown to become a substantial source of theological research material. The librarian is Brother Joseph Schneeweis, O.S.B., a Benedictine monk of Saint John's Abbey, Collegeville.

Notable graduates
Anscar Chupungco – Benedictine monk
Stanley Jaki – Benedictine monk
Brian V. Johnstone – Redemptorist priest
Wilton Daniel Gregory – Cardinal Archbishop of Washington
Erik Varden – Trappist monk and Bishop-Prelate of the Roman Catholic Territorial Prelature of Trondheim
Christopher J. Coyne – Bishop of Burlington
Charles John Brown – Apostolic Nuncio to the Philippines
Paul Augustin Mayer - Cardinal Prefect Emeritus of the Congregation for Divine Worship and the Discipline of the Sacraments
Piero Marini - President of the Pontifical Committee for International Eucharistic Congresses
 - Bishop of Bonfim
 - Benedictine monk
 - Benedictine monk
 - Benedictine monk
Jean Leclercq - Benedictine monk
 - Benedictine monk
 - Benedictine monk
 - Benedictine monk
 - Romanian Orthodox Church Bishop of Canada
Diego Giovanni Ravelli, Master of Pontifical Liturgical Celebrations

References

External links 
 

 
Catholic universities and colleges in Italy
Universities and colleges in Rome
Order of Saint Benedict
Benedictine colleges and universities
Rome R. XII Ripa
Educational institutions established in 1887
1887 establishments in Italy
Atheneum